The title was won by Orlando Pirates, their second championship in three seasons.

League table

Club Reduction 

 Free State Stars (Qwa-Qwa) and Ria Stars (Polokwane) were bought out by the league for 8 million rand (roughly US$800,000) each in order to reduce fixture congestion.

See also
 2001–02 Premier Soccer League

External links
RSSSF on PSL 02/03

2002-03
2002–03 in African association football leagues
2002–03 in South African soccer